A Koreatown is an ethnic enclave of Koreans.

Koreatown may specifically refer to:
Koreatown, Garden Grove
Koreatown, Los Angeles
Koreatown, Manhattan
Koreatown, Palisades Park
Koreatown, Toronto
Koreatown, Queens